Bob Storey is a former offensive and defensive back, and kick returner, who played four seasons in the Canadian Football League, winning 2 Grey Cups. He played 2 seasons and 28 games for the Hamilton Tiger-Cats, winning a Cup in 1967, and 2 seasons and 27 games for the Montreal Alouettes, winning another cup in 1970.

His father was Red Storey, famed Canadian football player (and Grey Cup champion) and sportsman.

External links
CFLAPEDIA BIO
FANBASE BIO

1945 births
Canadian football people from Montreal
Players of Canadian football from Quebec
Anglophone Quebec people
Canadian players of American football
Tulsa Golden Hurricane football players
Living people
Montreal Alouettes players
Hamilton Tiger-Cats players